Furcivena strigiferalis is a moth in the family Crambidae. It was described by George Hampson in 1896. It is found in Sikkim, India.

References

Moths described in 1896
Pyraustinae